Mutsumi Takahashi  is a Japanese-Canadian journalist. Since 1986, she has been one of the lead news presenters of CFCF-DT in Montreal, Quebec.

Early life and education 
After emigrating to Canada in 1963 from Shiroishi, Japan by way of Boston, Takahashi grew up in the Montreal suburb of Côte Saint-Luc, Quebec. When she was six years old, she was studying piano at the Toronto Conservatory of Music. She graduated from West Hill High School in the Notre-Dame-de-Grâce neighbourhood of Montreal. After graduating from Vanier College in 1976, Takahashi graduated from Concordia University in 1979 with a BA degree in psychology.

Career

Takahashi's first entry into television, while still a student at Concordia and a journalist for the university paper The Georgian, was in 1980 on a pilot project between CFCF and CUTV, the Concordia University television station. She then replaced Mary-Lou Basaraba as host for the half-hour show called Our City, which aired Sunday mornings on channel 12 at 10:30 AM.

She joined radio under the name of Lisa Takahashi and then CFCF in Montreal in 1982 as a news reporter. After four years, she was appointed as news presenter for Pulse (now known as CTV News) alongside veteran Bill Haugland until his retirement in 2006. She also portrayed news presenters in some minor roles for made-for-TV movies.

Takahashi anchors CTV News Montreal at noon and weeknights. Takahashi frequently earned the accolade from the Montreal Mirror'''s Best of Montreal'' polls as "Best Local Newscaster" and continues to do so with Cult MTL's continuation of the Best of Montreal tradition.

Takahashi is a notoriously private woman whose longstanding motto is "It's about the news. It's not about me. And it never will be." She has no social media presence, and almost never grants interviews. One of the few times she granted an interview came in May 2017, ahead of being presented with a lifetime achievement award from RTDNA Canada.

Personal life 
Takahashi is a Canadian citizen and was appointed to the Order of Canada in 2018. She is married to Michel Cayer.

References

External links
 
 CTVMontreal.ca Biography
 

Year of birth missing (living people)
Living people
Actresses from Montreal
Canadian television actresses
Canadian television news anchors
Canadian women television journalists
Concordia University alumni
CTV Television Network people
Japanese emigrants to Canada
Journalists from Montreal
Members of the Order of Canada
People from Côte Saint-Luc